Niigata held a mayoral election November 12, 2006.

Sources 
 Official results 
 ザ･選挙　-選挙情報-

Niigata (city)
2006 elections in Japan
Mayoral elections in Japan
November 2006 events in Japan